Microglyphis is a genus of gastropods belonging to the family Ringiculidae.

The species of this genus are found in Pacific Ocean.

Species:

Microglyphis angulata 
Microglyphis brevicula 
Microglyphis curtula 
Microglyphis furukawai 
Microglyphis globularis 
Microglyphis hasegawai 
Microglyphis japonica 
Microglyphis mazatlanica 
Microglyphis michelleae 
Microglyphis miranda 
Microglyphis perconica 
Microglyphis sabrinae

References

Gastropods